Franz Xaver Gruber (25 November 1787 – 7 June 1863) was an Austrian primary school teacher, church organist and composer in the village of Arnsdorf, who is best known for composing the music to "Stille Nacht" ("Silent Night").

Life
Gruber was born on 25 November 1787 in the village of Hochburg-Ach, Upper Austria, the son of linen weavers, Josef and Maria Gruber. His given name was recorded in the baptismal record as "Conrad Xavier," but this was later changed to "Franz Xaver". The Hochburger schoolteacher Andreas Peterlechner gave him music lessons.
 

Gruber worked as a weaver until the age of 18, then trained to become a schoolteacher. He completed his music education studying with the church organist of Burghausen, Georg Hartdobler. In 1807 Gruber became a schoolteacher in Arnsdorf. He also became the church caretaker and organist. In 1808 he married a widow, Maria Elisabeth Fischinger Engelsberger. They had two children, both of whom died young. After the death of his first wife in 1825, Gruber married a former student, Maria Breitfuss. They had ten children, four of whom survived to adulthood. In 1829 Gruber moved to Berndorf, and in later years to Hallein, Salzburg, where he was named choir director, singer and organist.

Maria Gruber died in childbirth in 1841. The following year he married Katherine Wimmer.

"Silent Night"
In 1816 he took on the additional responsibilities of organist and choirmaster at St Nicholas Church in the neighboring village of Oberndorf bei Salzburg.

Together with Joseph Mohr, a Catholic priest who wrote the original German lyrics, Gruber composed the music for the Christmas carol Silent Night. On Christmas Eve of 1818, Mohr, an assistant pastor at St Nicholas, showed Gruber a six-stanza poem he had written in 1816. He asked Gruber to set the poem to music. The church organ had broken down so Gruber produced a melody with guitar arrangement for the poem. The two men sang Stille Nacht for the first time at Christmas Mass in St Nicholas Church while Mohr played guitar and the choir repeated the last two lines of each verse. For a long time many thought that  Silent Night was written by Haydn, Mozart or Beethoven.

In later years, Gruber composed additional arrangements of the carol for organ and for organ with orchestra, as well as scores of other carols and masses, many of which are still in print and sung today in Austrian churches.

Family 
Gruber was the son of Joseph Gruber (1761-1821) and Anna Gruber (1766-1825). He was married three times: first to Elizabeth Tischinger (1781-1825), then to Maria Breitfuss (1806-1841) and finally to Katharina Wimmer (1842-1873). He had two sons with his second wife: Felix (1823-1868) and Franz (1827-1917).

References

External links
 
 Franz Xaver Gruber (1787 – 1863) Teacher, musician and composer of the melody of “Silent Night”
 Silent Night Association Life of Gruber
 History of song
 Born between Salzburg and Braunau am Inn
 
 
 Free scores at the Mutopia Project
 
 

1787 births
1863 deaths
19th-century composers
19th-century male musicians
19th-century organists
Austrian classical organists
Austrian composers
Austrian male composers
Austrian schoolteachers
Male classical organists
People from Braunau am Inn District
People from Hallein